George Peter Fivas II (born May 25, 1973) is an American film producer, music producer, director and actor living in Los Angeles.  He is one of the founding organizers of the jazz and popular music group, Apollo.  His directorial debut came in the form of Summer Solstice (2003), an independently produced coming-of-age drama, which includes a well-reviewed performance from Academy Award nominee and Golden Globe winner Karen Black (Five Easy Pieces and The Great Gatsby), and was released on Netflix in 2006.  He directed a music video for the song A New World (2008) by The JMD Project, a hit dance track in Europe, whose video has been broadcast on MTV Germany and other European outlets as an introduction to the Metropolis Revived concert series.

Fivas is also a published scientist, having co-authored several papers on seismological phenomena in the Intermountain Region of The United States.

References

External links 
 Apollo music group
 

American film producers
1973 births
Living people
Businesspeople from Salt Lake City